Franklin Hassell (born October 9, 1988) is an American professional basketball player for VEF Rīga of the Latvian–Estonian Basketball League. In 2012–13, he was the top rebounder in the Israel Basketball Premier League.

Career
Hassell competed in college for Old Dominion. As a senior he averaged 15 points and 9.4 rebounds per game for a team that went 27–7. He was named to the All-CAA First Team. After graduation he played for different teams in Israel, Italy and Turkey.

In 2012–13, he was the top rebounder in the Israel Basketball Premier League.

In 2015–16, Hassell played for Boulazac Dordogne, where he led the league in scoring with 18.4 points per game, and was second in rebounding, at 10.1 per contest.

In July 2018, Hassell competed in The Basketball Tournament for Monarch Nation, a team composed of Old Dominion alumni. The team lost to Overseas Elite in the second round.

On August 2, 2018 he signed a one-year contract with Polish club Stelmet Zielona Góra. However, he left the team in training camp. He signed with Cholet Basket on October 2, 2018. He conducted an interview about his Cholet experience with the Juneau Empire. https://www.juneauempire.com/life/different-vibe-us-basketball-player-talks-playing-for-france-team/

On July 6, 2019, Hassell returned to Le Portel.

On January 15, 2020, he has signed with Boulazac Basket Dordogne of the LNB Pro A. On December 26, 2021, Hassell signed with VEF Rīga of the Latvian–Estonian Basketball League.

The Basketball Tournament
Frank Hassell played for Team Monarch Nation in the 2018 edition of The Basketball Tournament. He averaged team-highs in points (12.5) and rebounds (10.5) per game and shot 83 percent from the free-throw line.  Team Monarch Nation reached the second round before falling to eventual champions Overseas Elite.

References

External links
Hassell at basketball-reference.com
Profile at eurobasket.com

1988 births
Living people
American expatriate basketball people in France
American expatriate basketball people in Israel
American expatriate basketball people in Italy
American expatriate basketball people in Turkey
American men's basketball players
Bandırma B.İ.K. players
Basketball players from Virginia
Bnei Hertzeliya basketball players
Canton Charge players
Cholet Basket players
ESSM Le Portel players
Hapoel Holon players
Old Dominion Monarchs men's basketball players
Pallacanestro Varese players
Power forwards (basketball)
Sportspeople from Chesapeake, Virginia